Keith F. Frazier (May 18, 1913 – June 17, 1992) was a minor league baseball player and manager who is notable for leading the St. Joseph Saints to a league championship in 1940. He was born in Colorado, United States. Used as both an outfielder and a pitcher, Frazier played from 1933 to 1941 as well as in 1945. He hit around .282 in his career, with a career-high of .343 with the Saints in 1940. That year, he also hit 28 doubles and 13 triples, also career highs. As a pitcher, he went 42–75 in 214 games.

Frazier also fought during World War II while serving in the Navy.

Manager career
Frazier managed for two seasons. In 1940, as mentioned, he managed the St. Joseph Saints to a league championship. In 1941, he managed the Stockton Fliers, leading them to the playoffs. However, they lost in the first round.

References

(January 5, 1940.) "Frazier May Pilot Salt Lake Club." San Jose News. Accessed October 2011.

1913 births
1992 deaths
Minor league baseball managers
Baseball players from Colorado
United States Navy personnel of World War II
St. Joseph Saints players